Anopheles bellator is a species of mosquito mainly located in southeast of State of São Paulo, Brazil, is a main vector of malaria.

References 

Insects described in 1906
bellator
Insects of Brazil